Miklós Fekete (10 February 1892 – 2 July 1917) was a Hungarian footballer. He competed in the men's tournament at the 1912 Summer Olympics. In World War I, the Russians took him prisoner, and he later died from an infection.

References

External links
 

1892 births
1917 deaths
Hungarian footballers
Hungary international footballers
Olympic footballers of Hungary
Footballers at the 1912 Summer Olympics
Footballers from Budapest
Association football forwards
Austro-Hungarian military personnel killed in World War I
Austro-Hungarian prisoners of war in World War I
World War I prisoners of war held by Russia